The American Folk Art Museum is an art museum in the Upper West Side of Manhattan, at 2, Lincoln Square, Columbus Avenue at 66th Street. It is the premier institution devoted to the aesthetic appreciation of folk art and creative expressions of contemporary self-taught artists from the United States and abroad.

Its collection holds over 8,000 objects from the 18th century to the present. These works span both traditional folk art and the work of contemporary self-taught artists and Art Brut. In its ongoing exhibitions, educational programming, and outreach, the museum showcases the creative expressions of individuals whose talents developed without formal artistic training.

Admission is free. The museum had record yearly attendance of more than 130,000 visitors.

History
Since receiving a provisional charter in 1961, the American Folk Art Museum has continually expanded its mission and purview. At its inception, the museum lacked a permanent collection, an endowment, and a building. Despite lacking these institutional fixtures, founding Trustees Joseph B. Martinson and Adele Earnest had a vision: the advancement of the understanding and appreciation of American folk arts. In the museum's nearly sixty-year history, this dedication has held true. The museum's evolving mission reflects the shifting understanding of folk art internationally.

The Museum of Early American Folk Arts, as it was known initially, held its first exhibition in a rented space on 49 West 53rd Street in 1961. The museum's collection was launched in 1962 with the gift of a gate in the form of an American flag, celebrating the nation's centennial. The gift reflected the museum's early focus on eighteenth and nineteenth-century vernacular arts from the northeast America.

In 1966, after receiving a permanent charter, the museum expanded its name and mission. As the Museum of American Folk Arts, it looked beyond the traditional definitions of American folk art. Its exhibitions and collection began to reflect “every aspect of the folk arts in America – north, south, east, and west.” Founding curator Herbert W. Hemphill Jr. “expanded the notion of folk art beyond traditional, utilitarian, and communal expressions.” Under his direction, the museum began to champion idiosyncratic and individualistic artwork from the fields of traditional and contemporary folk art. In doing so, the museum ushered in a new era in the field of twentieth-century folk art.
The 1990s brought new focus to the diversity and multiculturalism of American folk art. Offering a more inclusive vision, the museum began to present African American and Latino artworks in their exhibitions and permanent collections. Director Gerard C. Wertkin announced American folk art's common heritage as “promoting an appreciation of diversity in a way that does not foster ethnic chauvinism or racial division.”

The museum further established its broadened outlook with the 1998 formation of the Contemporary Center, a division of the museum devoted to the work of 20th and 21st century self-taught artists, as well as non-American artworks in the tradition of European art brut.  In 2001, the museum opened the Henry Darger Study Center to house 24 of the self-taught artist's works, as well as a collection of his books, tracings, drawings, and source materials.

In 2001, the museum chose its current name, American Folk Art Museum. Recognizing that American folk art could only be fully understood in an international context, the word American functions as an indication of the museum's location, emphasis, and principal patronage rather than as a limitation on the kind of art it collects, interprets, or presents. The museum's current programming reflects this shift in focus. Past exhibits have included folk arts of Latin America, England, Norway, among other countries and continents.

As the museum's mission developed, so did its effort to establish a permanent home. In 1979, the Museum's Board of Trustees purchased two townhouses on West 53rd Street, adjacent to Museum's rented quarters at 49 West 53rd Street. In 1984, while waiting to develop the West 53rd properties, the museum continued to organize exhibitions and educational programs from a former carriage house at 125 West 55th Street. Five years later, a new branch of the museum, the Eva and Morris Feld Gallery, opened at 2 Lincoln Square, New York, opposite Lincoln Center for the Performing Arts.

In 2001, a new building on 45–47 West 53rd Street was opened. Tod Williams and Billie Tsien designed an eight-level building on a forty-foot-wide, one hundred-foot-long site on 53rd Street. From 2001 to 2011, the midtown space served as the museum's main branch. However, facing increasingly high bond payments, the museum sold the midtown branch to the Museum of Modern Art. When MoMA announced that it was going to demolish the building in connection with its expansion, there was outcry and considerable discussion about the issue, but the museum ultimately proceeded with its original plans.

Following the sale, the American Folk Art Museum used its facility at 2 Lincoln Square as its main exhibition and shop space. In 2014, the museum's archives, library, and administrative staff moved to Long Island City, Queens.  In September 2017, the museum opened the Self-Taught Genius Gallery at its facility in Long Island City. The STG gallery shows art from the museum's collection in thematic exhibitions that change every few months.  The STG Gallery is funded in large part by the Henry Luce Foundation.

The collection
Standing as "one of New York City’s great treasures", the museum's 7,000 plus collection has been formed almost entirely through gifts. Spanning a wide variety of mediums, the collection includes over 1,200 paintings on canvas or panel, 1,500 drawings and works on paper, 1,000 sculptural objects, 1,000 textile items, 200 ceramic objects, 100 pieces of furniture, 300 decorated household items from the Historical Society of Early American Decoration, and two large-scale architectural models.

Additionally, the museum has a large collection of archives, artist files, films, recordings, photographs, original research, historical records, and other assorted and valuable ephemera. Most notably, the museum holds the largest collection of archival materials from self-taught artist Henry Darger.

The collection ranges from early portraits by Sheldon Peck, Ammi Phillips, Asa Ames, and Samuel Addison Shute and Ruth Whittier Shute, quilts and schoolgirl needlework, furniture, and weathervanes to works by acclaimed masters such as Thornton Dial, Morris Hirshfield, Martín Ramírez, Judith Scott, Mary T. Smith and Bill Traylor.

The museum continues to add to its growing collection. In recent years acquisitions have included a version of Edward Hicks's (1780–1849) famed The Peaceable Kingdom. Notably, this painting, which Hicks gave to his daughter, remained with Hicks's descendants for many years. The portraits Increase Child Bosworth and Abigail Munro Bosworth by Sheldon Peck (1797–1868), Pickman's Mephitic Models by Paul Laffoley (1935–2016), Plantation Life by Clemmentine Hunter (1886/87–1988), and Heavenly Children by William Matthew Prior (1806–1873). Street artist KAWS donated a rare sculpture by self-taught artist William Edmondson to the museum in 2021.

Selected collection highlights

Exhibitions
Each year, the museum mounts a number of exhibitions, which span from the traditional folk arts to the more contemporary “self-taught” expressions. The museum's exhibits frequently examine the works of a specific artist or the significance of a particular medium, such as quilts or tinsel paintings.

Through its exhibits, the museum continues to develop the understanding of folk and self-taught artists. Past exhibits have showcased the works of “undersung” masters,  such as Thomas Chambers and Asa Ames. Additionally, the museum has hosted solo exhibitions dedicated to the work of self-taught greats: Martín Ramírez, Eugene Von Bruenchenhein, Willem van Genk, Ronald Lockett, John Dunkley, Paa Joe, and Bill Traylor.

Past exhibits have also positioned traditional folk art in conversation with more contemporary art. In the museum's 2008 exhibit, “The Seduction of Light: Ammi Phillips/ Mark Rothko Compositions in Pink, Green, and Red” explored the visual connections between Rothko's famed color blocks and Phillip's heightened color palette.  In 2013, the museum invited thirteen fashion designers to create an original work, inspired by a piece in their collection. The resulting exhibit “Folk Couture: Fashion and Folk Art” ran from January 21 – April 23, 2014. Subsequent major exhibitions include 2016's Mystery and Benevolence: Masonic and Odd Fellows Folk Art, Securing the Shadow: Posthumous Portraiture in America, Eugen Gabritschevsky: Theater of the Imperceptible, Carlo Zinelli (1916–1974), 2017's War and Pieced: The Annette Gero Collection of Wartime Quilts, 2018's Vestiges & Verse: Notes From the Newfangled Epic, and, also in 2018, Charting the Divine Plan: The Art of Orra White Hitchcock (1796–1863). In 2019 the museum will show Made in New York City: The Business of Folk Art.

At the Self-Taught Genius Gallery in Long Island City, the exhibitions have included Holding Space, Handstitched Worlds: The Cartography of Quilts, and Roadside Attraction.

By raising traditional folk artists and self-taught artists from the periphery of the mainstream art world, the museum has continued to prove "the worth of instinctive, self-taught artistry."

From 2012 to 2022, the museum's Executive Director was Anne-Imelda Radice. Stacy C. Hollander was the museum's chief curator and director of exhibitions from 1992 until stepping down in 2019. Since joining the museum in 2013, Dr. Valérie Rousseau has served as the curator of self-taught art and art brut. Emilie Gevalt joined the museum as curator of folk art in 2019.

Notable exhibitions
In 2014, the museum launched the exhibition, Self-Taught Genius: Treasures from the American Folk Art Museum. Featuring more than 100 works of art, "Self-Taught Genius" offered "an intellectually provocative effort to rethink the nature of artistic creativity" from the eighteenth century to the present. Following its New York premiere, the exhibition travelled to six cities, as part of a national tour funded by the Henry Luce Foundation's 75th anniversary initiative.

Publications

In December 2013, the American Folk Art Museum launched a fully accessible digital archive of 117 issues of its in-house magazine, Folk Art, formerly known as The Clarion.  From winter 1971 to fall 2008, Folk Art, was published on average of three times a year. It served as a forum for original research and new scholarship in the field of American folk art. Topics ranged from traditional arts, such as portraiture, schoolgirl arts, painted furniture, and pottery, to original discourses on under-recognized artists.

Honors
In 2007, it was among over 530 New York City arts and social service institutions to receive part of a $20 million grant from the Carnegie Corporation, which was made possible through a donation by New York City mayor Michael Bloomberg.In 2013, the Encyclopedic Palace, in the Museum's collection, served as the inspiration and theme for the 55th installation of the international Venice Biennale. Marino Auriti (1891–1980), a self-taught Italian American artist, created the work as an architectural model for imaginary museum that would house all worldly knowledge. Massimiliano Gioni, artistic director of the Biennale, detailed the enduring relevancy of Auriti's work. “Today, as we grapple with a constant flood of information, such attempts to structure knowledge into all-inclusive systems seem even more necessary and even more desperate.”

Gift shop
Cited as one of the “World’s Best Museum Gift Shops,” the museum's gift shop offers gift items, handcrafted in the folk tradition, such as jewelry, personal accessories, frames, toys, objects for the home, as well as note cards, books, and catalogs.

See also
List of museums and cultural institutions in New York City

References

Further reading
Folk Art (formerly The Clarion). Magazine published 1971–2008 by the American Folk Art Museum.
Anderson, Brooke Davis. Darger: The Henry Darger Collection at the American Folk Art Museum. New York: American Folk Art Museum in association with Harry N. Abrams, Inc., 2001.
Anderson, Brooke Davis. Martín Ramírez. Seattle: Marquand Books in association with American Folk Art Museum, 2007. A New York Times Notable Book.
Hollander, Stacy C. American Radiance: The Ralph Esmerian Gift to the American Folk Art Museum. New York: American Folk Art Museum in association with Harry N. Abrams, Inc., 2001.
Hollander, Stacy C., and Brooke Davis Anderson. American Anthem: Masterworks from the American Folk Art Museum. New York: American Folk Art Museum in association with Harry N. Abrams, Inc., 2001.
Kelly, Andrew. Kentucky by Design: The Decorative Arts and American Culture: Quilts, Coverlets, and Shaker Material Culture. Lexington: University Press of Kentucky, 2015. 
Warren, Elizabeth V. Quilts: Masterworks from the American Folk Art Museum. New York: American Folk Art Museum in association with Rizzoli International Publications, Inc., 2010.
Zimiles, Murray. Gilded Lions and Jeweled Horses: The Synagogue to the Carousel. With a foreword by Gerard C. Wertkin and an essay by Vivian B. Mann. Lebanon, N.H.: University Press of New England/Brandeis University Press in association American Folk Art Museum, 2007. Winner of the 2007 National Jewish Book Award, Visual Arts.

External links

American Folk Art Museum official website
List of recent American Folk Art Museum exhibitions
List of upcoming American Folk Art Museum exhibitions
"Chastened, Folk Art Museum Puts Down Healthier Roots" Robin Pogrebin, The New York Times, April 2, 2013.
"Crossing borders, ignoring boundaries,", Meghan Daily, The Magazine Antiques, March/April 2014.

Art museums established in 1961
Buildings and structures completed in 2001
Museums of American art
Folk art museums and galleries in New York (state)
Art museums and galleries in New York City
Museums in Manhattan
1961 establishments in New York City
Lincoln Square, Manhattan